The Three Thieves (Italian: I tre ladri) is a 1954 Italian-French comedy film directed by Lionello De Felice and starring Totò, Jean-Claude Pascal and Simone Simon.

Cast

References

Bibliography
 Ennio Bìspuri. Totò: principe clown : tutti i film di Totò. Guida Editori, 1997.

External links

1954 films
1954 comedy films
French comedy films
Italian comedy films
1950s Italian-language films
Films directed by Lionello De Felice
French black-and-white films
Italian black-and-white films
1950s French films
1950s Italian films